The 2013–14 Iranian Futsal Hazfi Cup were the 1st season of the Iranian futsal knockout competition. Mahan Tandis Qom won the title with defeating Misagh Tehran in the final.

Participating teams
Totally 67 teams participate in the 2013–14 season. These teams are divided into three main groups which are introduced here. Teams in bold are still active in the competition:

Group 1  (Start their matches from the first round)

 In total 16 teams (16 teams from 16 different provinces in Iran (each province: one)).

 Computer Shahram Alborz (Alborz Province)
 Kiyan Ardabil (Ardabil Province)
 Urom Alyazh Urmia (West Azerbaijan Province)
 Farid Lahijan (Gilan Province)
 Sorkhpoushan Hamadan (Hamadan Province)
 Taid Water Hormozgan (Hormozgan Province)
 Moghavemat Basij Ilam (Ilam Province)
 Sheydan Isfahan (Isfahan Province)
 Arg Birjand (South Khorasan Province)
 Nezam Mohandesi Kermanshah (Kermanshah Province)
 Foolad Sadat Gachsaran (Kohgiluyeh and Boyer-Ahmad Province)
 Payam Valiasr Arak (Markazi Province)
 Setaregan Bartar Garmsar (Semnan Province)
 Shahrdari Iranshahr (Sistan and Baluchistan Province)
 Labaniyat Aala Abarkuh (Yazd Province)
 Khales Sazan Zanjan (Zanjan Province)

Group 2  (Start their matches from the second or third  round)
 In total 37 teams (All teams playing in Iran Futsal's 2nd Division & Iran Futsal's 1st Division):

Iran Futsal's 2nd Division

 Afagh Tehran
 Azarakhsh Bandar Abbas
 Barobon Qazvin
 Borna Khuzestan B
 Cut Shahrud
 Kiyan Isfahan
 Mes Rafsanjan
 Milad Nour Markazi
 Moghavemat Qarchak
 Pas Qavamin
 Polad Gostaresh Borujerd
 Safa Tos
 Shahid Faraji
 Shahid Jahan Nejhadiyan
 Shahin Lordegan
 Shahin Kermanshah
 Shahin Kuhdasht
 Shahrdari Rasht
 Shohada Jalin Gorgan

Iran Futsal's 1st Division

 Ali Sadr Hamadan
 Arjan Shiraz
 Bargh Shiraz
 Borna Khuzestan
 Eisatis Yazd
 Ferdosi Mashhad
 Iran Jahan Mashhad
 Kashi Nilou Isfahan
 Keshavarz Qazvin
 Kiyan Pelast
 Moghavemat Alborz
 Moghavemat Kerman
 Naft Omidiyeh
 Shahrdari Isfahan
 Penthouse Mashhad
 Persepolis Behzisti
 Shahrdari Neka
 Zagros Khuzestan

Group 3  (Start their matches from the fourth round)
 In total 14 teams (All teams playing in Iranian Futsal Super League):

Iranian Futsal Super League

 Dabiri Tabriz
 Farsh Ara Mashhad
 Giti Pasand Isfahan
 Hilal Ahmar Tabriz
 Mahan Tandis Qom
 Melli Haffari Iran
 Misagh Tehran
 Amaliyat Qeyr Sanati Mahshahr
 Rah Sari
 Shahid Mansouri Qarchak
 Shahrdari Saveh
 Shahrdari Tabriz
 Tasisat Daryaei
 Zam Zam Isfahan

First stage

First round

1 Sheydan Isfahan withdrew. 
2 Computer Shahram Alborz withdrew after 1st leg. 
3 Kiyan Ardabil withdrew after 1st leg

Second round

Third round

Second stage

Fourth round (round of 32)

Fifth round (round of 16)

Sixth round (1/4 Final - Last 8)

Semi-final (1/2 Final - Last 4)

1st leg

2nd leg

Final

Awards 

 Winner: Mahan Tandis Qom
 Runners-up: Misagh Tehran

Bracket

* after extra time

See also 
 2013–14 Iranian Futsal Super League
 2013–14 Futsal 1st Division
 2014 Iran Futsal's 2nd Division
 2013–14 Persian Gulf Cup
 2013–14 Azadegan League
 2013–14 Iran Football's 2nd Division
 2013–14 Iran Football's 3rd Division
 2013–14 Hazfi Cup
 Iranian Super Cup

References

 
Hazfi Cup
Hazfi Cup